Patricia T. Lantz (born February 7, 1938) is a former American politician from Washington. Lantz is former Democratic member of the Washington House of Representatives from January 1997 to January 2009, representing the 26th district. She served as Chair of the House Judiciary Committee. She did not seek re-election in 2008 and was succeeded by Jan Angel, a Republican.

References

External links
Washington State Legislature - Rep. Patricia Lantz official WA House website
Follow the Money - Patricia Lantz
2006 2004 2002 2000 1998 1996 campaign contributions

Members of the Washington House of Representatives
1938 births
Living people
Women state legislators in Washington (state)
People from Auburn, Washington
People from Gig Harbor, Washington
21st-century American women